Lagena is a genus of foraminifera in the superfamily Nodosariacea.

References

External links 
 

Foraminifera genera